Spatterdash may refer to:

 Gaiters
 Spats (footwear)
 Spatter (disambiguation)